This is a list of Montana State Bobcats football players in the NFL Draft.

Key

Selections

References

External links
 

Montana State

Montana State Bobcats NFL Draft